is a vertical-scrolling shoot 'em up video game developed by Kaneko and published by Hudson Soft for the PC Engine CD-ROM² in 1992. It is a spin-off of the Star Soldier series and was localized for North America as Fantasy Star Soldier. However, this version was never released. The game was released for the Wii Virtual Console on March 7, 2008 in Japan, March 16, 2008 in Europe and later in North America on August 11, 2008. The title is also playable on the Turbografx-16/PC Engine Mini Console.

Star Parodier is a vertical scrolling shooter, much like the Star Soldier games, and features many of the same conventions, such as collecting power-ups to upgrade the player's weapons, and facing several bosses and minibosses as they progress through the game. The game also features the 2- and 5-minute high score time attack modes seen in previous games.

However, in parodying the hard sci-fi atmosphere of the Star Soldier games, Star Parodier takes a lighthearted approach by featuring cute, cartoonish graphics and toning down the violence (for example, defeated enemies wave white flags in surrender). The players choose from three craft to play as in the game: the Paro Ceaser from Star Soldier, a giant flying Bomberman or an anthropomorphic PC Engine console that shoots HuCards and CD-ROMs at enemies.

See also
Parodius

References

External links
 Super CD-ROM2 version in Hudson Soft Official Website (in Japanese)
 Virtual Console version in Hudson Soft Official Website (in Japanese)

1992 video games
Crossover video games
Hudson Soft games
Kaneko games
Parody video games
Shoot 'em ups
Single-player video games
Star Soldier
TurboGrafx-CD games
Video games developed in Japan
Virtual Console games